Nate Martin (born January 13, 1983) is an American entrepreneur, game designer, and software executive. He is the Co-founder and CEO of Puzzle Break, the first American room escape company. He is often referred to as the "Founding Father of Escape Rooms." He is an alumnus of the DigiPen Institute of Technology with a Bachelor of Science in Real-Time Interactive Simulation and Computer Science.

Career

Software 
In 2006, Martin started at Microsoft in the Windows team. Before leaving in 2013, he worked as a software engineer and program manager on products including Windows Vista, Windows 7, Windows 8, Windows RT, and Windows 8.1.

Martin joined Electronic Arts as a Senior Product Manager in 2013 to help run the Global Online Services organization. During his time at EA, he worked on several games including Battlefield 4.

Puzzle Break 
In August 2013, Martin and Dr. Lindsay Morse co-founded the escape room company Puzzle Break. Based in Seattle, Puzzle Break was started with an initial self-investment from Martin of $7,000. Under Martin’s leadership, Puzzle Break has opened locations in Seattle, San Francisco, Long Island, Boston, and on several Royal Caribbean cruise ships. Puzzle Break’s revenue in 2016 was over $1,000,000. He was named a 2017 Puget Sound Business Journal 40 Under 40 Honoree.

Media 
Martin is a frequent lecturer and podcast guest on the topics of escape rooms, interactive entertainment, and entrepreneurship. His interviews have appeared in the New York Times, Entrepreneur Magazine, and Forbes. In 2017, he spoke on the future of experiential storytelling at the Sundance Film Festival.

References 

1983 births
American business executives
American company founders
Living people
People from Beaver, Pennsylvania